Dr. Oetker is a German-French multinational company that produces baking powder, cake mixes, frozen pizza, pudding, cake decoration, cornflakes, party candles, and various other products.

The company is a wholly owned branch of the Oetker Group, headquartered in Bielefeld, Germany.

Portfolio 
The portfolio includes more than 300 individual companies in five different businesses, among them food (including Dr. Oetker GmbH and Coppenrath & Wiese KG), breweries (Radeberger Group), sparkling wine and spirits (Henkell & Co. Sektkellerei), banking (Bankhaus Lampe), and "further interests" (among them chemicals, financing, and participation, and a number of high-class hotels all over Europe).

History

Formation

The company was founded by August Oetker in 1891.

First World War
Oetker's son Rudolf and his wife Ida had two children, Rudolf-August and Ursula; however, the senior Rudolf was later killed in the First World War. His widow Ida remarried Richard Kaselowsky, and they had four more children with Kaselowsky raising Rudolf-August and Ursula as his own.

Second World War
During the 1930s and 1940s, Rudolf-August Oetker was an active member of the Waffen SS of the Third Reich. Oetker provided pudding mixes and munitions to German troops. It is also reported that the business used slave labour in some of its facilities. A bronze bust of Richard Kaselowsky, a prominent German entrepreneur and member of the Nazi party, still sits within the company headquarters in Bielefeld.

International expansion
Rudolf August Oetker, the grandson of August Oetker, led the company between 1944 and 1981 when it achieved its highest growth. The Oetker family's private bank also employed as a director Rudolf von Ribbentrop (1921–2019), son of Joachim von Ribbentrop and Anna Elisabeth Henkell of the Wiesbaden wine family and a wartime Waffen SS officer like Oetker. The company expanded its presence internationally, acquiring many companies around the world. When Rudolf Oetker stepped down from his leadership position, the fourth generation of the Oetker family took over from him. The family ownership established the management principle that "the interests of the company have priority over those of the family".

August Oetker, the great-grandson of the founder, led the company from 1981 until 2010. Under his tenure, it expanded further in all areas, including shipping, food, and brewing.

Richard Oetker, August Oetker's brother, took over as CEO in 2010.

International presence

Australia
In January 2011, Dr. Oetker purchased the Australian frozen pizza business of Simplot, including the well-known brand, Papa Giuseppi's. In 2015, Dr. Oetker acquired the Queensland brand, Queen Fine Foods.

Brazil
In Brazil, the company has a site in São Paulo. The company supplies powdered desserts, frozen pizza, and teas. The company has been established in Brazil since 1954.

Canada
The company has its head office and factory in Mississauga, Ontario. In 1962, Dr. Oetker entered the Canadian market as Condima Imports Ltd. In 1992, it purchased the "Shirriff" line of products, which are made at the Mississauga plant. In 2003, the Condima name was dropped and the company started using the Dr. Oetker brand. In July 2011 Dr. Oetker announced the building of its first North American factory in London, Ontario, to make frozen pizzas made from Ontario produce and ingredients that will be shipped in Canada and the US. In August 2014, McCain Foods announced the sale of its North American frozen pizza business to Dr. Oetker. Through product placement on its packaging and through employee giving, the company supports the children's charity SOS Children's Villages Canada.

Denmark
In Denmark, a wide selection is available. Baking powder, frozen pizza, pudding, and cake decorations are sold in most supermarkets.
The company has an office in Glostrup.

Estonia
In Estonia, frozen pizzas are available at supermarkets.

Finland
In Finland, frozen pizzas, pudding, and cake decoration are available at supermarkets.

France
In France, frozen pizzas are available at supermarkets.

India
In India, the company operates offices in Bangalore, Mumbai and New Delhi. Dr. Oetker sauces, spreads, dessert toppings, cake mixes and salad dressings can be found in all major grocery chains.

Italy
In Italy, Dr. Oetker operates under the brand Cameo. The Italian division was founded in Milan in 1933 as Oetker and then later moved to Desenzano del Garda, which continues until today. In 1953, the name is switched to Cammeo, a more Italian and easy-listening word, changed again for the last time in 1984 to Cameo.

Latvia 
In Latvia various Dr. Oetker products are available, such as frozen pizzas, baking powders and dessert powders.

Lithuania
Many Dr. Oetker products are available, including frozen pizzas, baking powder, and gelatine, the latter in both unflavoured and dessert forms.

Malaysia
In Malaysia, Dr. Oetker was currently operated after the acquisition of Nona Foods. The previous ownership of Nona Foods was Toro Food Industries. Previously, Dr. Oetker was represented in Malaysia by Kart Food Industries, between 1998 and 2002, when the company was sold to Amtek Berhad.

Following the acquisition of Nona Foods, the local subsidiary of Dr. Oetker produces jelly mixes and seasoning flour, in addition to pizzas and baking preparations.

Namibia
In Namibia, frozen pizzas are available at supermarkets.

Netherlands
In the Netherlands, frozen pizza, cake mixes, powdered desserts but also desserts like Wolkentoetje (pudding cups) can be found in all major grocery chains.

New Zealand
As with the purchase of Simplot Australia's frozen pizza business (see above), Dr. Oetker has been able to move into the New Zealand market.

Norway
In Norway, Dr. Oetker is the second-largest seller of frozen pizza with a market share of 16.5%. They also sell a range of baking powder and cake decorations.

Portugal
In Portugal, frozen pizzas and some other Dr. Oetker products are available at supermarkets and some small stores.

Romania
The company has been present in Romania since 1998, when it took over Regal Corporation. Four years later, it opened a production line near Curtea de Argeș, where the majority of the products sold in Romania are produced. In 2007 Dr. Oetker acquires the local brand Inedit (food soy products), in 2009 the local brand Adazia (food ingredients, food spices and egg-colour), in 2015 the local brand Alex (food ingredients, egg-colour, spices), and in 2016 the local brand Morarita (frozen pastry).

In 2018, Dr. Oetker was one of the biggest players in the food market in Romania (top 100).

Slovakia
In 1993, the company purchased a local factory Slovamyl in Boleráz, and took over its local brands Zlatý klas and BB puding. In March 2023, Dr. Oetker announced they will close the factory by mid-2023.

Spain
In Spain, frozen pizzas are available at supermarkets.

South Africa
In South Africa, frozen pizza products in many variants, frozen creamed spinach and other ready to eat frozen meals are available at supermarkets.

Sweden
In Sweden, Dr Oetker's baking soda, gelatin, and other baking items, as well as frozen pizza products, are available at supermarkets.

Tunisia
in Tunisia, Dr. Oetker has a production facility, producing goods, such as baking ingredients, powder desserts and cake mixes for Tunisian market and exports to more than 15 African countries.

Turkey 
In Pancar-Torbali, Izmir, Dr. Oetker has a production facility, producing goods such as frozen pizza, baking powder and cake mixes primarily for the Turkish market.

United Kingdom

In the United Kingdom, the company has sites in Leeds, Leyland and Sherburn-in-Elmet. They were a supplier of yogurt in the UK under the Onken brand name, which they no longer own. The company currently supplies frozen pizza, mostly under the Chicago Town and Ristorante brands. In 2007, Dr Oetker acquired the SuperCook range of cake ingredients and partially prepared cake mixes. This operation was expanded in 2017 with a new bake in the box cake mix range.

United States
In August 2014, McCain Foods announced the sale of its North American frozen pizza business, including Ellio's Pizza, to Dr. Oetker. In 2018, Dr. Oetker acquired the cake decorating and baking company Wilton. Wilton was founded in 1929 and was acquired by TowerBrook Capital Partners in 2009.

Radeberger Group

Radeberger Group contains the breweries of the Oetker group. Radeberger is Germany's biggest group of breweries and has a market share of about 14–15%. Fifteen German breweries are part of the Radeberger Group. The major national brands are Radeberger Pils (brewed in Radeberg near Dresden), Jever Pils (brewed in Jever); Clausthaler, an alcohol-free beer, and Schöfferhofer Weizen.

Regional brands are Binding (brewed in Frankfurt), Schultheiss (Berlin), Sternburg (Leipzig), Brinkhoff's (Dortmund), Freiberger (Saxony), Tucher (Fürth) and various Kölsch brands.

Hotels

The company runs ten hotels under the brand Oetker Collection. The portfolio is currently:
 L'Apogée Courchevel in Courchevel, France — situated in the French Alps.
 Brenners Park-Hotel & Spa in Baden-Baden, Germany.
 Hotel Le Bristol in Paris, France — located on the Rue Faubourg-St. Honore.
 Château Saint-Martin & Spa in Vence, France —  between Nice and Antibes.
 Hotel du Cap, Cap d'Antibes, France — a hotel in Cap d'Antibes, on the French Riviera.
 Eden Rock St Barths in Saint Barthélemy.
 Lanesborough Hotel in London.
 Palácio Tangará in São Paulo, Brazil.
 Jumby Bay Island in Antigua

See also
 List of frozen food brands

References

External links
 
 Dr. August Oetker Group

 
Baking powder
Bielefeld
Brand name desserts
Companies based in North Rhine-Westphalia
Food and drink companies established in 1891
Dairy products companies of Germany
Food manufacturers of the United Kingdom
Frozen pizza brands
German brands
Multinational companies headquartered in Germany
Pasta companies
1891 establishments in Germany
Baking mixes